Brézé is a former commune in the Maine-et-Loire department in western France. On 1 January 2019, it was merged into the new commune Bellevigne-les-Châteaux. The Château de Brézé is a small, dry-moated castle.

Population

Personalities
Claire-Clémence de Maillé-Brézé, born here in 1628, Princess of Condé

See also
Communes of the Maine-et-Loire department

References

External links

Official site 

Former communes of Maine-et-Loire